Part II is the second part to the Kings of Crunk album. It is an EP by Lil Jon & the East Side Boyz that consists mainly of remixes of the studio album Kings of Crunk.

Track listing

Charts

Weekly charts

Year-end charts

References

2003 debut EPs
Lil Jon & the East Side Boyz albums
Albums produced by Lil Jon
Sequel albums